= Frank Scheck =

American film critic

- Born: United States
- Occupation: Film critic

Frank Scheck is an American film critic. He is best known for his reviews in the New York Post and The Hollywood Reporter. He formerly edited STAGES Magazine and worked as a theater critic for the Christian Science Monitor in the 1990s.
